Michael or Mike Gleason may refer to:
 Michael Gleason (rower) (1876–1923), American rower
 Michael Gleason (musician), American musician, singer and songwriter
 Mike Gleason (announcer), ESPN anchor
 Mike Gleason (politician), member of the Arizona House of Representatives

See also
 Michael Gleeson (disambiguation)